East Berkshire was a county constituency in the county of Berkshire. It returned one Member of Parliament (MP) to the House of Commons of the Parliament of the United Kingdom, elected by the first past the post voting system.

The constituency was created for the 1983 general election, and abolished for the 1997 general election.

History 
This safe Conservative seat was represented for its entire existence by Andrew MacKay.

Boundaries 
1983–1997: The District of Bracknell, and the Royal Borough of Windsor and Maidenhead wards of Datchet, Horton and Wraysbury, Old Windsor, Sunningdale and South Ascot, and Sunninghill.

The constituency was formed largely from the District of Bracknell (formerly the Rural District of Easthampstead), which was previously part of the County Constituency of Wokingham. It also included the parts of the Royal Borough of Windsor and Maidenhead which had formerly comprised the Rural District of Windsor (previously part the County Constituency of Windsor and Maidenhead) and the parishes in the former Rural District of Eton in Buckinghamshire which had been transferred to Berkshire by the Local Government Act 1972 (previously part of the County Constituency of Beaconsfield).

Its main settlement was Bracknell, and it also included Ascot, Sunningdale, Sunninghill, Datchet, Crowthorne, Sandhurst, and Old Windsor.

The seat was abolished for the 1997 general election when the majority of the constituency was absorbed into the new County Constituency of Bracknell. Eastern areas, comprising parts of the Royal Borough of Windsor and Maidenhead and also including Ascot, transferred to the re-established County Constituency of Windsor.

Members of Parliament

Elections

Elections in the 1980s

Elections in the 1990s

See also
List of parliamentary constituencies in Berkshire

Notes and references 

Parliamentary constituencies in Berkshire (historic)
Constituencies of the Parliament of the United Kingdom established in 1983
Constituencies of the Parliament of the United Kingdom disestablished in 1997